ISPSD (International Symposium on Power Semiconductor Devices and ICs) is an annual conference established in 1988 by the Institute of Electrical and Electronics Engineers (IEEE) on a wide range of power technologies.  Host to over 500 experts from across the world, ISPSD is the premier forum for technical discussions in all areas of power semiconductor devices and power integrated circuits, recently focusing on gallium nitride and silicon carbide devices.

The conferences are held in Asia, North America, and Europe on a rotating basis. ISPSD celebrated its 30th anniversary in Chicago, United States from May 13 to 17, 2018. The previous year's conference was held in Sapporo, Japan from May 28 to June 1, 2017. ISPSD 2016 was held in Prague, Czech Republic in June 2016. ISPSD 2019 was held in May 2019 in Shanghai, China.

References

Technology conferences
IEEE conferences
Semiconductor devices